Cornelia is an unincorporated community in Grant Township, Wright County, Iowa, United States. Lake Cornelia State Park is in the community.

History
Founded in the 1800s, Cornelia's population was just 3 in 1902, but had increaded to 41 by 1925.

Education
Cornelia is a part of the Clarion–Goldfield–Dows Community School District. It was in the Clarion–Goldfield Community School District, until July 1, 2014, when it merged into the current district.

References

Unincorporated communities in Wright County, Iowa
Unincorporated communities in Iowa